Verkhniye Irnykshi (Ürge Irnıqşı) is a rural locality (a village) in Abzanovsky Selsoviet, Arkhangelsky District, Bashkortostan, Russia. The population was 75 as of 2010. There are 3 streets.

Geography 
Verkhniye Irnykshi is located 11 km west of Arkhangelskoye (the district's administrative centre) by road. Abzanovo is the nearest rural locality.

References 

Rural localities in Arkhangelsky District